Chase is a 2022 Indian Kannada-language crime drama film directed by Vilok Shetty. . The film stars Radhika Narayan and Avinash S Divakar.

Cast 
Radhika Narayan as Nidhi
 Avinash S Divakar as Avinash
 Sheetal Shetty as a doctor
 Arjun Yogesh Raj as Yash
 Sushant Pujari
Aravind Bolar
Arvind Rao as driver
Swetha Sanjeevulu as Swetha

Production 
Radhika Narayan learnt Krav Maga for the role. Actor Avinash Divakar also worked as an art director for the film.

Reception 
Sunayana Suresh of The Times of India wrote that "Chase is a good outing to the cinema hall, even though the film did take a while to hit the screens. It will definitely interest lovers of the thriller genre".

References 

2020s Kannada-language films
2022 crime drama films
2022 films
Indian crime drama films

External links